Johann Baptist Wilhelm August Weber (10 January 1817, in Frankfurt am Main – 11 September 1873, in Düsseldorf) was a German painter; associated with the Düsseldorfer Malerschule.

Life and work 
He began studying landscape painting in his hometown, with Carl Heinrich Rosenkranz (1801-1851), then moved to Darmstadt in 1835, where he continued his studies with the court painter, Johann Heinrich Schilbach. This was followed by a study trip to Switzerland.

Upon returning to Frankfurt, he studied at the Städelschule until 1838. In that year, he went to Düsseldorf, where he spent a year at the KunstAkademie, and soon became a teacher himself. His notable students included Theodor Martens,  and John Robinson Tait. Due to his proven ability, he was appointed a Professor by King Friedrich Wilhelm III.

In 1863, he was named an honorary member of the Düsseldorfer Künstler-Liedertafel (Round Table) and, the following year, he became an Honorary Master of the Freies Deutsches Hochstift in Frankfurt. In 1871, he developed an eye condition that left him unable to paint for over a year. In 1873, shortly after he had resumed painting, he died of pneumonia.

Although his works are realistic in appearance, most of them are composed of imaginative or idealistic elements. The art historian, described his work as expressing a "Post-Romantic" sensibility, inspired by Salomon van Ruysdael. In addition to landscape paintings, he also created watercolors and lithographs.

A large number of his works were damaged or destroyed during World War II. Many of the paintings subsequently sold as his were actually the work of a Swiss artist, also named August Weber, who lived from 1898 to 1957.

Sources 
 
 "Weber, August". In: Friedrich von Boetticher: Malerwerke des 19. Jahrhunderts. Beitrag zur Kunstgeschichte, Vol.2/2, Saal–Zwengauer, Boetticher’s Verlag, Dresden 1901, pg.979 (Online)
 "Weber, August", In: Richard Klapheck: Die Kunstsammlungen der Staatlichen Kunstakademie zu Düsseldorf. Strucken, Düsseldorf 1928
 "Weber, August", In: Allgemeines Lexikon der Bildenden Künstler von der Antike bis zur Gegenwart, Vol. 35: Waage–Wilhelmson, pp. 215–216, E. A. Seemann, Leipzig, 1942

External links 

 More works by Weber @ ArtNet

19th-century German painters
German male painters
1817 births
1873 deaths
Deaths from pneumonia in Germany
19th-century German male artists